Alavian or Alvian may refer to:
 Alavian, East Azerbaijan
 Alvian, Gilan